Several Canadian naval units have been named HMCS Algonquin.

 (I) was a V-class destroyer active from 1944 to 1970.
 (II) is an  active from 1973 to 2015.

Battle Honours
Norway, 1944.
Normandy, 1944.
Arctic, 1944–45.
Arabian Sea

Royal Canadian Navy ship names